The War Game is a 1966 British pseudo-documentary film that depicts a nuclear war and its aftermath. Written, directed and produced by Peter Watkins for the BBC, it caused dismay within the BBC and also within government, and was subsequently withdrawn before the provisional screening date of 6 October 1965. The corporation said that "the effect of the film has been judged by the BBC to be too horrifying for the medium of broadcasting. It will, however, be shown to invited audiences..."

The film eventually premiered at the National Film Theatre in London, on 13 April 1966, where it ran until 3 May. It was then shown abroad at several film festivals, including the Venice one where it won the Special Prize. It also won the Academy Award for Best Documentary Feature in 1967.

The film was eventually televised in Great Britain on 31 July 1985, during the week before the fortieth anniversary of the Hiroshima bombing, the day before a repeat screening of Threads.

Synopsis
The narrator opens with how Britain's nuclear deterrent policy threatens a would-be aggressor with devastation from Victor and Vulcan Mk II nuclear bombers of the British V bomber force. In a crisis, these would be dispersed throughout the country; in a war, so would the thermonuclear strikes against them, on top of already extensive bombardment of major cities.

On Friday, 16 September, the UK declares a state of emergency. The Chinese have invaded South Vietnam, and the United States has authorised their forces there to use tactical nuclear warfare. The Soviets and East Germans threaten to invade West Berlin if the U.S. does not withdraw its decision. In the southeast county of Kent, emergency committees of city and borough councillors are faced with receiving a mass evacuation of children, mothers, and the infirm. Homeowners are forced to billet and feed the arrivals under threat of imprisonment, and unoccupied homes are requisitioned. Ration cards are issued. The following day, civil defence distributes a booklet detailing the hazards of nuclear war; the booklet had been available for some years, but did not sell very well. The emergency siren system is tested; it is estimated that by the time an attack could be confirmed to the system, there would remain some 2.5–3 minutes to impact, or in the case of a submarine attack, possibly under thirty seconds. There is a run on construction supplies, and price gouging puts them out of the reach of many.

The US does not acquiesce to communist demands and the invasion takes place. Two U.S. Army divisions attempt to fight their way into Berlin, but the Russian and East German forces overwhelm them. U.S. President Lyndon B. Johnson authorises the NATO commanders to use their tactical nuclear weapons, and they soon do so. The film remarks that many Soviet strategic IRBMs are believed to be liquid-fueled and stored above ground, making them extremely vulnerable. It hypothesises that the Soviet Union would be obliged to fire all of them in a very early stage of a nuclear exchange to avoid their destruction.

On 18 September a doctor, now on the staff of an emergency medical aid unit, pays a house call to a family in Canterbury, Kent, along with two civil defence workers. At 9:13 am the air-raid sirens start to wail in the distance, followed by a klaxon horn from a police car. The family and visitors frantically try to move furniture into a makeshift shelter. At 9:16 am a one-megaton Soviet thermonuclear warhead overshoots Manston Airfield, 12 miles away, and airbursts six miles away. One of the defence workers is bringing a boy in from the yard, and both are struck by the heat wave at a distance to cause third-degree burns, and "melting of the upturned eyeball." The people inside frantically try to put out the fires until the shock front hits.

27 miles away, seeing the explosion gives a small child severe retinal burns. His father scoops him up and the family hide under a table as their house trembles from the blast wave, then the one from Gatwick Airport, Sussex, 41 miles away. Rochester burns from a missile that exploded off-course on its way to London Airport. Firemen take severe casualties from the >100 mph winds of the firestorm. As the firestorm's center rises to 800 °C, and it consumes oxygen and replaces it with methane, carbon monoxide, and carbon dioxide, responders and civilians alike collapse from heat stroke and the gases and die where they stood. By 10:47 am, British V-bombers near Russia's border inflict the same on its people.

Armed police shoot victims who have been triaged and assigned to be left to die. PTSD and other conditions are widespread, and the police and British Army lose several of their number to the strain. In Kent, which is described as "lightly hit", there are far too many dead to bury. Officials in the Rochester area burn corpses and collect their wedding rings in a bucket for later identification. As the film notes happened in Hiroshima and Nagasaki, many become "apathetic and profoundly lethargic, people living often in their own filth." As food supplies dwindle, authorities in Kent eventually withhold food for those maintaining law and order. Hunger riots turn deadly. Anti-authority elements seize a police ammunition truck, and bloodily seize and pilfer a government food control centre. Policemen are killed. Civil disturbance and obstruction of government officers become capital offences; two men are shown being executed by firing squad for such acts. The country's infrastructure is destroyed, and basic medicines and medical care are unavailable. The initial stages of scurvy set in. The film ends in a refugee compound in Dover on the first Christmas since the war. Bewildered and traumatised orphan children are asked what they want to grow up to be, and they answer that they "don't want to be nothing" or simply not answer at all. "Silent Night" plays over the closing credits.

Style
The story is told in the style of a news magazine programme. It wavers between a pseudo-documentary and a drama film, with characters acknowledging the presence of the camera crew in some segments and others (in particular the nuclear attack) filmed as if the camera was not present. The combination of elements also qualifies it as a mondo film. It features several different strands that alternate throughout, including a documentary-style chronology of the main events, featuring reportage-like images of the war, the nuclear strikes, and their effects on civilians; brief contemporary interviews, in which passers-by are interviewed about what turns out to be their general lack of knowledge of nuclear war issues; optimistic commentary from public figures that clashes with the other images in the film; and fictional interviews with key figures as the war unfolds.

The film features a voice-over narration that describes the events depicted as plausible occurrences during and after a nuclear war. The narration attempts to instil in the viewing audience that the civil defence policies of 1965 have not realistically prepared the public for such events, particularly suggesting that the policies neglected the possibility of panic buying that would occur for building materials to construct improvised fallout shelters.

The public are generally depicted as lacking all understanding of nuclear matters with the exception of a character with a double-barrelled shotgun who successfully implemented the contemporary civil defence advice, and heavily sandbagged his home. The film does not focus on individual experiences, but rather the collective  British population, who rely on government preperations and are not fully convinced of the dangers of nuclear war until the final hours before the attack.

The film contains this quotation from the Stephen Vincent Benét poem "Song for Three Soldiers":

Production
Of his intent, Peter Watkins said:

 ... Interwoven among scenes of "reality" were stylized interviews with a series of "establishment figures" – an Anglican Bishop, a nuclear strategist, etc. The outrageous statements by some of these people (including the Bishop) – in favour of nuclear weapons, even nuclear war – were actually based on genuine quotations. Other interviews with a doctor, a psychiatrist, etc. were more sober, and gave details of the effects of nuclear weapons on the human body and mind. In this film I was interested in breaking the illusion of media-produced "reality". My question was – "Where is 'reality'? ... in the madness of statements by these artificially-lit establishment figures quoting the official doctrine of the day, or in the madness of the staged and fictional scenes from the rest of my film, which presented the consequences of their utterances?

To this end, the docudrama employs juxtaposition by, for example, quickly cutting from the scenes of horror after an immediate escalation from military to city nuclear attacks to a snippet of a recording of a calm lecture by a person resembling Herman Kahn, a renowned RAND strategist, hypothesizing that a counterforce (military) nuclear war would not necessarily escalate immediately into countervalue-targeted (i.e. civilian-targeted) nuclear war. The effect of this juxtaposition is to make the speaker appear out of touch with the "reality" of rapid escalation, as depicted immediately before his contribution.

The film was shot in the Kent towns of Tonbridge, Gravesend, Chatham and Dover. The cast was almost entirely made up of non-actors, as was Watkins' preference, casting having taken place via a series of public meetings several months earlier. Much of the filming of the post-strike devastation was shot at the Grand Shaft Barracks, Dover. The narration was provided by Peter Graham with Michael Aspel reading the quotations from source material.

Release
The War Game itself finally saw television broadcast in the United Kingdom on BBC2 on 31 July 1985, as part of a special season of programming entitled After the Bomb (which had been Watkins's original working title for The War Game). After the Bomb commemorated the 40th anniversary of the bombing of Hiroshima and Nagasaki. The broadcast was preceded by an introduction from Ludovic Kennedy.

On August 27, 1968, nearly 250 people at a peace rally in the Edwin Lewis Quadrangle in Philadelphia, attended the screening of the film sponsored by the Pennsylvania Coalition. Like the United Kingdom, the film was also banned from National Educational Television in the United States due to its theme.

Reception and legacy 
The film holds a Rotten Tomatoes rating of 93% based on 14 reviews, with an average score of 8.46/10.

Roger Ebert gave the film a perfect score, calling it "[o]ne of the most skillful documentary films ever made." He praised the "remarkable authenticity" of the firestorm sequence and describes its portrayal of bombing's aftermath as "certainly the most horrifying ever put on film (although, to be sure, greater suffering has taken place in real life, and is taking place today)." "They should string up bedsheets between the trees and show "The War Game" in every public park" he concludes, "It should be shown on television, perhaps right after one of those half-witted war series in which none of the stars ever gets killed." David Cornelius of DVD Talk called it "one of the most disturbing, overwhelming, and downright important films ever produced." He writes that the film finds Watkins "at his very best, angry and provocative and desperate to tell the truth, yet not once dipping below anything but sheer greatness from a filmmaking perspective [...] an unquestionable masterpiece of raw journalism, political commentary, and unrestrained terror."

Accolades
The film won the 1967 Academy Award for Best Documentary Feature.

In a list of the 100 Greatest British Television Programmes drawn up by the British Film Institute in 2000, voted for by industry professionals, The War Game was placed 27th. The War Game was also voted 74th in Channel Four's 100 Greatest Scary Moments.

See also
 List of nuclear holocaust fiction
 Nuclear weapons and the United Kingdom
 Nuclear weapons in popular culture
 Survival film, about the film genre, with a list of related films
 Threads, a 1984 British docudrama about nuclear war

Notes

References

External links
 
 
 
 The War Game at the BBC
 BBC contemporary "censorship" from John Cook's article in The Conversation
 Encyclopedia of Television 
 British Film Institute Screen Online UK only
 The War Game - The Controversy by Patrick Murphy in Film International, May 2003.
 A transcript of the film

1966 films
1966 television films
BBC controversies
BBC television dramas
Black-and-white British television shows
Best Documentary Feature Academy Award winners
British black-and-white films
Films directed by Peter Watkins
Apocalyptic films
Cold War films
British science fiction television films
Films about nuclear war and weapons
Films about World War III
Films set in Kent
Anti-nuclear films
1960s English-language films
1960s British films